Sir John Burgess Karslake, QC (13 December 1821 – 4 October 1881) was an English lawyer and politician.

The son of Henry Karslake, a solicitor and Confidential Secretary to the Duke of Kent, by his wife Elizabeth Marsh Preston, the daughter of Richard Preston, Q.C. and sometime M.P. for Ashburton, he was educated at Harrow. His elder brother, Edward Kent Karslake (1820-1892), was a Q.C., sometime M.P. for Colchester and Fellow of Balliol College, Oxford.
 
He was appointed a barrister of the Middle Temple in 1846, and a Queen's Counsel in 1861. He held office as Solicitor General for England and Wales in 1866-67 and as Attorney General for England and Wales from 1867 to 1868 and again in 1874. He was knighted in 1866 and appointed a Privy Counsellor in 1876. He was a member of the Judicature Commission.

Between 1867 and 1868 he was a Conservative Party Member of Parliament for Andover. That constituency was reduced to one seat in 1868 and Karslake unsuccessfully contested Exeter at the general election of that year. He was MP for Huntingdon 1873–1876. He died in Marylebone aged 59, unmarried, having had to retire from Parliament in February 1876 due to progressively worsening eyesight, which finally resulted in total blindness.

He was the brother or nephew of John Karslake Karslake.

Sources

Who's Who of British Members of Parliament, Volume I 1832-1885, edited by M. Stenton (The Harvester Press 1976)
Concise Dictionary of National Biography

External links 

1821 births
1881 deaths
Attorneys General for England and Wales
Conservative Party (UK) MPs for English constituencies
People educated at Harrow School
Members of the Privy Council of the United Kingdom
Solicitors General for England and Wales
UK MPs 1865–1868
UK MPs 1868–1874
UK MPs 1874–1880
Members of the Middle Temple